Odd Olsen Ingerø (born 22 September 1950) is a Norwegian civil servant and former Governor of Svalbard.

He was born in Skjeberg. In 2005, he was appointed director of the National Criminal Investigation Service. He was the Governor of Svalbard between 2001 and 2005. He was succeeded by Sven Ole Fagernæs, and was preceded by Morten Ruud. Before this he was chief of police in Sør-Varanger and Fredrikstad. He has also been a deputy judge.

He became governor for a second term on 16 September 2009, succeeding Per Sefland, who held the post from 2005 to 2009.

References

1950 births
Living people
Norwegian civil servants
Norwegian jurists
Norwegian police chiefs
Governors of Svalbard